Quinlan Independent School District is a public school district based in Quinlan, Texas (USA).

In addition to Quinlan, the district serves the towns of West Tawakoni and Hawk Cove, most of Union Valley, as well as rural areas in southern Hunt County. A small portion of northern Kaufman County also lies within the district. The student population is approximately 2,600 (68% Anglo, 27% Hispanic, 2% African-American, <1% Asian, and <1% Native American). QISD has five campuses (two elementary, one middle/junior high school, one high school, and one alternative) as well as various support facilities. QISD's mascot is the panther, and the school colors are blue and white.

Quinlan ISD has partnered with Paris Junior College to offer students the opportunity to pursue an associate’s degree while attending high school at no cost to families. This includes tuition, fees, books, and transportation. As of September 2018, 81 students have completed the associate's program. Almost 700 FHS students have earned almost 17,000 free college credits.

In addition to core college courses, the district has expanded career and technology offerings to students. Many of these programs provide industry certifications while they are in high school or the training will prepare them to receive advanced certifications upon graduation. In the 2017-2018 school year, FHS students earned 85 career certifications. These programs include cosmetology, animal science, automotive technology, business and finance, ag-mechanics, audio/visual production and STEM (Science, Technology, Engineering, and Mathematics).

Quinlan ISD provides a wide array of community resources, including a free Fitness Center, Community Library and Museum Center, low-priced community meeting rooms, inexpensive Community Education programs and much more.

Schools
Ford High School (Grades 9-12)
Thompson Middle School (Grades 6-8)
Butler Intermediate School (Grades 3-5)
Cannon Elementary School (Grades PK-2)

Additional facilities
Alternative Learning Center (In-School Suspension Classes and Credit Recovery Programs)
Quinlan Education Center (Free Public Library, Fitness Center, and Community Education Classes)

References

External links

School districts in Hunt County, Texas
School districts in Kaufman County, Texas